Oricopis setipennis is a species of beetle in the family Cerambycidae. It was described by Lea in 1917. It is known from Australia.

References

Epicastini
Beetles described in 1917